Dunkeld is a town in Perth and Kinross, Scotland.

Dunkeld may also refer to:

 Dunkeld, Gauteng, a suburb of Johannesburg, South Africa
 Dunkeld, Ontario, a community of Brockton, Ontario, Canada
 Dunkeld, Queensland, a locality in the Maranoa Region, Queensland, Australia
 Dunkeld, Victoria, a town in Victoria, Australia
 House of Dunkeld, a royal house of Scotland

See also 
 Dunkeld West